Walls Have Eyes is the fourth solo album released by singer Robin Gibb. It was released in November 1985 on EMI America Records in the US and Polydor Records throughout the rest of the world, and produced by Maurice Gibb and Tom Dowd. The two singles from the album, "Like a Fool" and "Toys", did not chart in the US and UK. Gibb did not release a solo album in eighteen years until 2003 with Magnet. Unlike Secret Agent which contains dance numbers, this album contains mostly ballads.

Background

Writing credits
Barry Gibb co-wrote eight of the ten songs, and contributed a part lead vocal to "Toys". The credits for the songs are precisely stated as R. B. & M. Gibb in most cases, and B. R. & M. Gibb in others. Although the songs all have Robin's signature simplicity of form, Barry's hand is evident in the melody lines, especially in the verses.

Recording
Like the previous album Secret Agent, it was recorded in Criteria Studios rather than the Middle Ear Studio which was owned by the Bee Gees. The only regulars from previous Gibb recordings was George Terry on guitar with Steve Farris of Mr. Mister. Session musician Phil Chen was credited as the bass player on the song "Gone with the Wind".

The album was produced by Atlantic Records engineer and producer Tom Dowd. The copyright registrations on the songs span only between 28 August to 16 September 1985, and a period of just a few weeks keys in with what Dowd recalled a tight budget. On the sessions, there was one outtake, "Modern Girls"; Gibb later said that this "did not fit".

Reception
The album did not chart as well as the lead single "Like a Fool", and failed to chart in the US and UK. However, "Like a Fool" was a smash hit in Brazil and the single "Toys" did reach #27 on the Canada Adult Contemporary chart. Promo videos were also made for "Like a Fool" and "Toys". Walls Have Eyes is rare on compact disc giving its distinction as the last solo album recorded by any of the Gibb brothers issued on vinyl until Barry's In the Now in 2016. Polydor copies of the album which were converted onto CD were found, but because of low sales, it was not later reissued on CD internationally.  Barry later stated that Robin didn't receive the feedback he wanted.

A remixed version of "Toys" appeared on the Tales from the Brothers Gibb box set in 1990.

Track listing
All songs written by Robin, Barry and Maurice Gibb, except where noted.

Personnel
Main artist
 Robin Gibb – lead and backing vocals

Musicians and production
 Maurice Gibb – bass, keyboards, backing vocals
 Barry Gibb – backing vocals on "Toys"
 Duane Hitchings, Mitchell Froom – keyboards
 Phil Chen – bass on "Gone with the Wind"
 Sandy Gennaro – drums
 George Terry, Steve Farris – guitar
 Alto Reed, Ed Calle – French horn
 Valter Antunes – percussion
 Dennis Hetzendorfer – engineer
 Leslie Shapiro – assistant audio engineer

References

1985 albums
Robin Gibb albums
New wave albums by English artists
Synth-pop albums by English artists
EMI Records albums
Polydor Records albums
Albums produced by Maurice Gibb
Albums produced by Tom Dowd